Kibler High School is a historic high school building located at the city of Tonawanda in Erie County, New York.  It was designed by the Buffalo architectural firm of Edward B. Green, & Sons and constructed from 1925 to 1927 in the Classical Revival style.  The exterior features a rusticated ground floor, central entrance pavilion with pilasters and pediment, an elaborately decorated cupola, and red tile hip roofs. The school was named for the president of the Tonawanda Board of Education in 1924, William J. Kibler.  The building functioned as a school until 1983. The building was renovated as senior housing in the mid-2000s.

It was listed on the National Register of Historic Places in 1999.

References

External links
Kibler High School - U.S. National Register of Historic Places on Waymarking.com

School buildings on the National Register of Historic Places in New York (state)
School buildings completed in 1927
Defunct schools in New York (state)
Buildings and structures in Erie County, New York
National Register of Historic Places in Erie County, New York
Green & Wicks buildings
1927 establishments in New York (state)